Arnasco ( or ) is a comune (municipality) in the Province of Savona in the Italian region of Liguria, located about  southwest of Genoa and about  southwest of Savona.

Arnasco borders the following municipalities: Albenga, Castelbianco, Cisano sul Neva, Ortovero, Vendone, and Zuccarello.

Twin towns — sister cities
Arnasco is twinned with:

  Brading, United Kingdom
  Río Cauto, Cuba

References

Cities and towns in Liguria
Articles which contain graphical timelines